"Beautiful Maria of my Soul" is a song prominently featured in the 1992 motion picture The Mambo Kings. In the film, it is performed in Spanish by Antonio Banderas and in English by Los Lobos. The song was written and composed by Arne Glimcher and Robert Kraft. The film is based on the book The Mambo Kings Play Songs of Love.

In the film, the character (Banderas) writes the song for his long-lost love, Maria Riveiro (Talisa Soto).

This song received an Academy Award nomination, eventually won by "A Whole New World", from Aladdin. Banderas refused to sing the song live, and tenor Plácido Domingo became the first Spaniard to perform at the Oscars ceremony.

Italian pop duo Paola & Chiara covered the song in their 2002 studio album Festival.

References 

Spanish-language songs